Parksville-Qualicum is the name of a provincial electoral district in the Canadian province of British Columbia.  It was first contested in the 1991 election. Following redistribution, the area became part of the Nanaimo-Parksville and Alberni-Qualicum ridings. It was again contested in the 2009 general election, and was won by Liberal, Ron Cantelon. The riding consists of the city of Parksville, the town of Qualicum Beach and the communities of Lantzville and Nanoose Bay.

Demographics

MLAs

Electoral history

References

Sources 
 Elections BC Historical Returns

British Columbia provincial electoral districts on Vancouver Island
Parksville, British Columbia